Meng Jun is the name of:

Meng Jun (footballer) (born 1981), Chinese female association footballer
Meng Jun (field hockey) (born 1982), Chinese male field hockey player